The Roman calendar was the calendar used by the Roman Kingdom and Roman Republic. Although primarily used of Rome's pre-Julian calendars, the term often includes the Julian calendar established by the reforms of the dictator Julius Caesar and emperor Augustus in the late 1stcenturyBC.

The original calendar consisted of ten months beginning in spring with March; winter was left as an unassigned span of days. These months each had 30 or 31 days, and ran for 38 nundinal cycles, each forming an eight-day week (nine days counted inclusively in the Roman manner, hence the name) ended by religious rituals and a public market. The winter period was later divided into two months, January and February. The legendary early kings Romulus and Numa Pompilius were traditionally credited with establishing this early fixed calendar, which bears traces of its origin as an observational lunar one. In particular, the kalends, nones, and ides of the month seem to have derived from the first sighting of the crescent moon, the first-quarter moon, and the full moon respectively. The system ran well short of the solar year, and it needed constant intercalation to keep religious festivals and other activities in their proper seasons. This is a typical element of lunisolar calendars. 

After the establishment of the Republic, years began to be dated by consulships and control over intercalation was granted to the pontifices, who eventually abused their power by lengthening years controlled by their political allies and shortening the years in their rivals' terms of office. Having won his war with Pompey, Caesar used his position as Rome's chief pontiff to enact a calendar reform in 46BC, coincidentally making the year of his third consulship last for 446days. In order to avoid interfering with Rome's religious ceremonies, the reform added all its days towards the ends of months and did not adjust any nones or ides, even in months which came to have 31days. The Julian calendar was supposed to have a single leap day on 24 February (a doubled  or ) every fourth year, but following Caesar's assassination the priests figured this using inclusive counting and mistakenly added this bissextile day every three years. In order to bring the calendar back to its proper place, Augustus was obliged to suspend intercalation for one or two decades. The revised calendar remained slightly longer than the solar year; by the 16th century the date of Easter had shifted so far away from the vernal equinox that Pope Gregory XIII ordered the calendar's adjustment, resulting in the Gregorian calendar.

History

Prehistoric lunar calendar
The original Roman calendar is believed to have been an observational lunar calendar whose months began from the first signs of a new crescent moon. Twelve such months would have fallen  short of the solar year; without adjustment, such a year would have quickly rotated out of alignment with the seasons in the manner of the Islamic calendar. Given the seasonal aspects of the later calendar and its associated religious festivals, this was presumably avoided through some form of intercalation or the suspension of the calendar during winter.

Rome's 8-day week, the nundinal cycle, was shared with the Etruscans, who used it as the schedule of royal audiences. It was presumably a part of the early calendar and was credited in Roman legend variously to Romulus and Servius Tullius.

Legendary 10 month calendar
Such a decimal division fitted general Roman practice. The four 31 day months (March, May, Quintilis, and October) were called "full" and the others "hollow". Its 304 days made up exactly 38 nundinal cycles. The system is usually said to have left the remaining 50 odd days of the year as an unorganized "winter", although Licinius Macer's lost history apparently stated the earliest Roman calendar employed intercalation instead and Macrobius claims the 10 month calendar was allowed to shift until the summer and winter months were completely misplaced, at which time additional days belonging to no month were simply inserted into the calendar until it seemed things were restored to their proper place.

Later Roman writers credited this calendar to Romulus, their legendary first king and culture hero, although this was common with other practices and traditions whose origin had been lost to them. Some scholars doubt the existence of this calendar at all, as it is only attested in late Republican and Imperial sources and supported only by the misplaced names of the months from September to December. Rüpke also finds the coincidence of the length of the supposed "Romulan" year with the length of the first ten months of the Julian calendar to be suspicious.

Other traditions existed alongside this one, however. Plutarch's Parallel Lives recounts that Romulus's calendar had been solar but adhered to the general principle that the year should last for 360 days. Months were employed secondarily and haphazardly, with some counted as 20 days and others as 35 or more.

Republican calendar
The attested calendar of the Roman Republic was quite different. It followed Greek calendars in assuming a lunar cycle of  days and a solar year of  synodic months ( days), which align every fourth year after the addition of two intercalary months. Two months were added at the end of the year to complete the cycle during winter, January and February, before the intercalary month inserted every two years; the intercalary month was sometimes known as Mercedonius.  

The inequality between the lunar year of 355 days and the tropical year of  days led to a shortfall over four years of ( × 4) = 41 days. Theoretically, 22 days were interpolated into the calendar in the second year of the four-year cycle and 23 days in the fourth. This produced an excess of four days over the four years in line with the normal one day excess over one year.

It did not acquire the alternative name Mercedonius until post-classical times. 23 February was the Terminalia and in a normal year it was  Thus the dates of the festivals of the last five days of February were preserved on account of them being actually named and counted inclusively in days before the calends of March; they were traditionally part of the celebration for the new year. There was occasionally a delay of one day (a  being inserted between 23 February and the start of the ) for the purpose of avoiding a clash between a particular festival and a particular day of the week (see  for another example). The Roman superstitions concerning the numbering and order of the months seem to have arisen from Pythagorean superstitions concerning the luckiness of odd numbers.

These Pythagorean-based changes to the Roman calendar were generally credited by the Romans to Numa Pompilius, Romulus's successor and the second of Rome's seven kings, as were the two new months of the calendar. Most sources thought he had established intercalation with the rest of his calendar. Although Livy's Numa instituted a lunar calendar, the author claimed the king had instituted a 19-year system of intercalation equivalent to the Metonic cycle centuries before its development by Babylonian and Greek astronomers. Plutarch's account claims he ended the former chaos of the calendar by employing 12months totalling 354days—the length of the lunar and Greek years—and biennial intercalary months of 22days.

According to Livy's Periochae, the beginning of the consular year changed from March to January1 in 153BC to respond to a rebellion in Hispania. Plutarch believed Numa was responsible for placing January and February first in the calendar; Ovid states January began as the first month and February the last, with its present order owing to the Decemvirs. W. Warde Fowler believed the Roman priests continued to treat January and February as the last months of the calendar throughout the Republican period.

According to the later writers Censorinus and Macrobius, to correct the mismatch of the correspondence between months and seasons due to the excess of one day of the Roman average year over the tropical year, the insertion of the intercalary month was modified according to the scheme: common year (355 days), leap year with 23-day February followed by 27-day Mercedonius (377 days), common year, leap year with 23-day February followed by 28-day Mercedonius (378 days), and so on for the first 16 years of a 24-year cycle. In the last 8 years, the intercalation took place with the month of Mercedonius only 27 days, except the last intercalation which did not happen. Hence, there would be a typical common year followed by a leap year of 377 days for the next 6 years and the remaining 2 years would sequentially be common years. The result of this twenty-four-year pattern was of great precision for the time: 365.25 days, as shown by the following calculation:

The consuls' terms of office were not always a modern calendar year, but ordinary consuls were elected or appointed annually. The traditional list of Roman consuls used by the Romans to date their years began in 509BC.

Flavian reform
Gnaeus Flavius, a secretary (scriba) to censor App. Claudius Caecus, introduced a series of reforms in 304BC. Their exact nature is uncertain, although he is thought to have begun the custom of publishing the calendar in advance of the month, depriving the priests of some of their power but allowing for a more consistent calendar for official business.

Julian reform

Julius Caesar, following his victory in his civil war and in his role as pontifex maximus, ordered a reformation of the calendar in 46BC. This was undertaken by a group of scholars apparently including the Alexandrian Sosigenes and the Roman M. Flavius. Its main lines involved the insertion of ten additional days throughout the calendar and regular intercalation of a single leap day every fourth year to bring the Roman calendar into close agreement with the solar year. The year 46BC was the last of the old system and included three intercalary months, the first inserted in February and two more— and —before the kalends of December.

Later reforms

After Caesar's assassination, Mark Antony had Caesar's birth month Quintilis renamed July in his honor. After Antony's defeat at Actium, Augustus assumed control of Rome and, finding the priests had (owing to their inclusive counting) been intercalating every third year instead of every fourth, suspended the addition of leap days to the calendar for one or two decades until its proper position had been restored. See Julian calendar: Leap year error. In 8BC, the plebiscite Lex Pacuvia de Mense Augusto renamed Sextilis August in his honor.

In large part, this calendar continued unchanged under the Roman Empire. (Egyptians used the related Alexandrian calendar, which Augustus had adapted from their wandering ancient calendar to maintain its alignment with Rome's.) A few emperors altered the names of the months after themselves or their family, but such changes were abandoned by their successors. Diocletian began the 15-year indiction cycles beginning from the AD297 census; these became the required format for official dating under Justinian. Constantine formally established the 7-day week by making Sunday an official holiday in 321. Consular dating became obsolete following the abandonment of appointing nonimperial consuls in AD541. The Roman method of numbering the days of the month never became widespread in the Hellenized eastern provinces and was eventually abandoned by the Byzantine Empire in its calendar.

Days

Roman dates were counted inclusively forward to the next one of three principal days within each month:

 Kalends ( or ), the 1st day of each month
 Nones ( or ), the 7thday of "full months" and 5thday of hollow ones, 8days—"nine" by Roman reckoning—before the Ides in every month
 Ides (variously  or ), the 15thday of "full months" and the 13thday of hollow ones, one day earlier than the middle of each month.

These are thought to reflect a prehistoric lunar calendar, with the kalends proclaimed after the sighting of the first sliver of the new crescent moon a day or two after the new moon, the nones occurring on the day of the first-quarter moon, and the ides on the day of the full moon. The kalends of each month were sacred to Juno and the ides to Jupiter. The day before each was known as its eve; the day after each was considered particularly unlucky.

The days of the month were expressed in early Latin using the ablative of time, denoting points in time, in the contracted form "the 6thDecember Kalends". In classical Latin, this use continued for the three principal days of the month but other days were idiomatically expressed in the accusative case, which usually expressed a duration of time, and took the form "6th day before the December Kalends". In late Latin, this idiom was sometimes abandoned in favor of again using the ablative of time.

The kalends were the day for payment of debts and the account books kept for them gave English its word calendar. The public Roman calendars were the fasti, which designated the religious and legal character of each month's days. The Romans marked each day of such calendars with the letters:

 F (fastus, "permissible") on days when it was legal to initiate action in the courts of civil law ("allowed days")
 C (comitialis) on fasti days during which the Roman people could hold assemblies
 N (nefastus) on days when political and judicial activities were prohibited
 NP (uncertain) on public holidays (feriae)
 QRCF (uncertain) on days when the "king" (rex sacrorum) could convene an assembly

Each day was also marked by a letter from A to H to indicate its place within the nundinal cycle of market days.

Weeks

The nundinae were the market days which formed a kind of weekend in Rome, Italy, and some other parts of Roman territory. By Roman inclusive counting, they were reckoned as "ninth days" although they actually occurred every eighth day. Because the republican and Julian years were not evenly divisible into eight-day periods, Roman calendars included a column giving every day of the year a nundinal letter from A to H marking its place in the cycle of market days. Each year, the letter used for the markets would shift  along the cycle. As a day when the city swelled with rural plebeians, they were overseen by the aediles and took on an important role in Roman legislation, which was supposed to be announced for three nundinal weeks (between ) in advance of its coming to a vote. The patricians and their clients sometimes exploited this fact as a kind of filibuster, since the tribunes of the plebs were required to wait another three-week period if their proposals could not receive a vote before dusk on the day they were introduced. Superstitions arose concerning the bad luck that followed a nundinae on the nones of a month or, later, on the first day of January. Intercalation was supposedly used to avoid such coincidences, even after the Julian reform of the calendar.

The 7-day week began to be observed in Italy in the early imperial period, as practitioners and converts to eastern religions introduced Hellenistic and Babylonian astrology, the Jewish Saturday sabbath, and the Christian Lord's Day. The system was originally used for private worship and astrology but had replaced the nundinal week by the time Constantine made Sunday an official day of rest in AD 321. The hebdomadal week was also reckoned as a cycle of letters from A to G; these were adapted for Christian use as the dominical letters.

Months
The names of Roman months originally functioned as adjectives (e.g., the January kalends occur in the January month) before being treated as substantive nouns in their own right (e.g., the kalends of January occur in January). Others are uncertain. February may derive from the Februa festival or its eponymous  ("purifications, expiatory offerings"), whose name may be either Sabine or preserve an archaic word for sulphuric. April may relate to the Etruscan goddess Apru or the verb  ("to open"). May and June may honor Maia and Juno or derive from archaic terms for "senior" and "junior". A few emperors attempted to add themselves to the calendar after Augustus, but without enduring success.

In classical Latin, the days of each month were usually reckoned as:

 
 
Dates after the ides count forward to the kalends of the next month and are expressed as such. For example, March19 was expressed as "the 14th day before the April Kalends", without a mention of March itself. The day after a kalends, nones, or ides was also often expressed as the "day after" owing to their special status as particularly unlucky "black days".

The anomalous status of the new 31-day months under the Julian calendar was an effect of Caesar's desire to avoid affecting the festivals tied to the nones and ides of various months. However, because the dates at the ends of the month all counted forward to the next kalends, they were all shifted by one or two days by the change. This created confusion with regard to certain anniversaries. The ambiguity caused honorary festivals to be held on either or both dates.

Intercalation

The Republican calendar only had 355days, which meant that it would quickly unsynchronize from the solar year, causing, for example, agricultural festivals to occur out of season. The Roman solution to this problem was to periodically lengthen the calendar by adding extra days within February. February was broken into two parts, each with an odd number of days. The first part ended with the Terminalia on the 23rd, which was considered the end of the religious year; the five remaining days beginning with the Regifugium on the 24th formed the second part; and the intercalary month Mercedonius was inserted between them. In such years, the days between the ides and the Regifugium were counted down to either the Intercalary Kalends or to the Terminalia. The intercalary month counted down to nones and ides on its 5th and 13th day in the manner of the other short months.

Apparently because of the confusion of these changes or uncertainty as to whether an intercalary month would be ordered, dates after the February ides are attested as sometimes counting down towards the Quirinalia (Feb.17), the Feralia (Feb.21), or the Terminalia (Feb.23) rather than the intercalary or March kalends.

The third-century writer Censorinus says:

The fifth-century writer Macrobius says that the Romans intercalated  in alternate years (Saturnalia, 1.13.12); the intercalation was placed after 23February and the remaining five days of February followed (Saturnalia, 1.13.15). To avoid the nones falling on a nundine, where necessary an intercalary day was inserted "in the middle of the Terminalia, where they placed the intercalary month".

This is historically correct. In 167BC Intercalaris began on the day after 23February  and in 170BC it began on the second day after 23February. Varro, writing in the first centuryBC, says "the twelfth month was February, and when intercalations take place the five last days of this month are removed." Since all the days after the Ides of Intercalaris were counted down to the beginning of March Intercalaris had either 27days (making 377 for the year) or 28 (making 378 for the year).

There is another theory which says that in intercalary years February had  and Intercalaris had 27. No date is offered for the Regifugium in 378-day years. Macrobius describes a further refinement whereby, in one 8-year period within a 24-year cycle, there were only three intercalary years, each of 377days. This refinement brings the calendar back in line with the seasons, and averages the length of the year to 365.25days over 24years.

The Pontifex Maximus determined when an intercalary month was to be inserted. On average, this happened in alternate years. The system of aligning the year through intercalary months broke down at least twice: the first time was during and after the Second Punic War. It led to the reform of the 191 BC Acilian Law on Intercalation, the details of which are unclear, but it appears to have successfully regulated intercalation for over a century. The second breakdown was in the middle of the first century BC and may have been related to the increasingly chaotic and adversarial nature of Roman politics at the time. The position of Pontifex Maximus was not a full-time job; it was held by a member of the Roman elite, who would almost invariably be involved in the machinations of Roman politics. Because the term of office of elected Roman magistrates was defined in terms of a Roman calendar year, a Pontifex Maximus would have reason to lengthen a year in which he or his allies were in power or shorten a year in which his political opponents held office.

Obviously, the month beginning shifts forward (from the new moon, to the third quarter, to the full moon, to the first quarter, back the new moon) after intercalation.

Years

As mentioned above, Rome's legendary 10-month calendar notionally lasted for 304days but was usually thought to make up the rest of the solar year during an unorganized winter period. The Julian year was 365days long, with a leap day doubled in length every fourth year, almost equivalent to the present Gregorian system.

The calendar era before and under the Roman kings is uncertain but dating by regnal years was common in antiquity. Under the Roman Republic, from 509BC, years were most commonly described in terms of their reigning ordinary consuls. (Temporary and honorary consuls were sometimes elected or appointed but were not used in dating.) Consular lists were displayed on the public calendars. After the institution of the Roman Empire, regnal dates based on the emperors' terms in office became more common. Some historians of the later republic and early imperial eras dated from the legendary founding of the city of Rome ( or ). Varro's date for this was 753BC but other writers used different dates, varying by several decades. Such dating was, however, never widespread. After the consuls waned in importance, most Roman dating was regnal or followed Diocletian's 15-year Indiction tax cycle. These cycles were not distinguished, however, so that "year 2 of the indiction" may refer to any of 298, 313, 328, &c. The Orthodox subjects of the Byzantine Empire used various Christian eras, including those based on Diocletian's persecutions, Christ's incarnation, and the supposed age of the world.

The Romans did not have records of their early calendars but, like modern historians, assumed the year originally began in March on the basis of the names of the months following June. The consul M. Fulvius Nobilior (r.189BC) wrote a commentary on the calendar at the Temple of Hercules Musarum that claimed January had been named for Janus because the god faced both ways, suggesting it had been instituted as a first month. It was, however, usually said to have been instituted along with February, whose nature and festivals suggest it had originally been considered the last month of the year. The consuls' term of office—and thus the order of the years under the republic—seems to have changed several times. Their inaugurations were finally moved to 1January in 153BC to allow Q. Fulvius Nobilior to attack Segeda in Spain during the Celtiberian Wars, before which they had occurred on 15March. There is reason to believe the inauguration date had been 1May during the  until 222BC and Livy mentions earlier inaugurations on 15May, 1July, 1August, 1October, and 15December. Under the Julian calendar, the year began on 1January but years of the Indiction cycle began on 1September.

In addition to Egypt's separate calendar, some provinces maintained their records using a local era. Africa dated its records sequentially from 39BC; Spain from AD38. This dating system continued as the Spanish era used in medieval Spain.

Conversion to Julian or Gregorian dates
The continuity of names from the Roman to the Gregorian calendar can lead to the mistaken belief that Roman dates correspond to Julian or Gregorian ones. In fact, the essentially complete list of Roman consuls allows general certainty of years back to the establishment of the republic but the uncertainty as to the end of lunar dating and the irregularity of Roman intercalation means that dates which can be independently verified are invariably weeks to months outside of their "proper" place. Two astronomical events dated by Livy show the calendar 4 months out of alignment with the Julian date in 190BC and 2 months out of alignment in 168BC. Thus, "the year of the consulship of Publius Cornelius Scipio Africanus and Publius Licinius Crassus" (usually given as "205BC") actually began on 15March 205BC and ended on 14March 204BC according to the Roman calendar but may have begun as early as November or December 206BC owing to its misalignment. Even following the establishment of the Julian calendar, the leap years were not applied correctly by the Roman priests, meaning dates are a few days out of their "proper" place until a few decades into Augustus's reign.

Given the paucity of records regarding the state of the calendar and its intercalation, historians have reconstructed the correspondence of Roman dates to their Julian and Gregorian equivalents from disparate sources. There are detailed accounts of the decades leading up to the Julian reform, particularly the speeches and letters of Cicero, which permit an established chronology back to about 58BC. The nundinal cycle and a few known synchronisms—e.g., a Roman date in terms of the Attic calendar and Olympiad—are used to generate contested chronologies back to the start of the First Punic War in 264BC. Beyond that, dates are roughly known based on clues such as the dates of harvests and seasonal religious festivals.

See also

 List of calendars
 Julian, Alexandrian, Byzantine, & Gregorian calendars
 List of Roman consuls and ab urbe condita dating
 General Roman Calendar of the Catholic Church
 Roman festivals
 Undecimber

Notes

References

Citations

Bibliography
 .
 .
 . 
 
 .
 . 
 .
 . 
 . & 
 .
 .
 .
 . 
 . 
 .
 .
 . 
 . 
 .
 . 
 .
 .
 .
 .

External links
Chris Bennett's reconstruction of early Roman dates in terms of the Julian calendar
Early Roman Calendar – History
James Grout: The Roman Calendar, part of the Encyclopædia Romana
Roman Date Calculator The North American Institute of Living Latin Studies

 
Calendars
Calendar
Time in Italy